Atnsjøen is a lake in Innlandet county, Norway. The  lake lies along the border of the municipalities of Sør-Fron and Stor-Elvdal, just east of Rondane National Park. The Norwegian County Road 27 runs along the eastern shoreline of the entire lake.

See also
List of lakes in Norway

References

Sør-Fron
Stor-Elvdal
Lakes of Innlandet